Hackney Central was a constituency used for elections to the London County Council between 1889 and 1949, and again from 1955 until the council's abolition, in 1965.  The seat shared boundaries with the UK Parliament constituency of the same name.

Councillors

Election results

1889 to 1949

1955 to 1965

References

London County Council constituencies
Politics of the London Borough of Hackney